Meredith Warrington "Spud" Murray (October 28, 1928 – September 15, 2011) was an American minor league baseball player and Major League Baseball (MLB) batting practice pitcher. Murray was possibly the first full-time batting practice pitcher in Yankees history.

Career
Murray attended Media High School, where he starred in baseball and basketball, ranking among the best players in Delaware County, Pennsylvania. He signed with the Cleveland Indians. However, an arm injury limited his playing career. The Indians sold Murray to the independent Montgomery Rebels of the South Atlantic League in 1954.

Mayo Smith, the manager of the Philadelphia Phillies, hired Murray as his batting practice pitcher in 1958. He joined the New York Yankees in the same role two years later.

Personal
Murray lived in Waterloo, Pennsylvania. He enjoyed hunting and fishing, often going fishing with Mickey Mantle and Whitey Ford.

References

External links

1928 births
2011 deaths
Batavia Clippers players
Harrisburg Senators players
Wilkes-Barre Indians players
Reading Indians players
Birmingham Barons players
Tulsa Oilers (baseball) players
Montgomery Rebels players
Charlotte Hornets (baseball) players
Chattanooga Lookouts players
Baseball players from Pennsylvania
People from Media, Pennsylvania